Shenzhou International Group Holdings Limited is a Chinese clothing manufacturer, headquartered in Ningbo.

Shenzhou International states that it is "the largest vertically integrated knitwear manufacturer in China", and the country's largest exporter of knitwear, with customers including Nike, Adidas and Uniqlo.

The chairman is Ma Jianrong, who started as a factory worker, and rose to become a billionaire.

References

External links
 

Companies based in Ningbo
Clothing brands of China